The Morven Stakes was an American Thoroughbred horse race run between 1978 and 2001 at Meadowlands Racetrack in East Rutherford, New Jersey. A race on turf for two-year-old horses or either sex, it was last run over a distance of five furlongs (5/8 mile).

Historical notes
From inception in 1978 through 1998, the event was run on dirt. Its first two editions were run as the Morven Handicap. By 1984 the race had earned Grade 3 status which it maintained through 1987.

Future Hall of Fame jockey Angel Cordero Jr. won the 1979 and 1982 runnings of the Morven Stakes. Cordero was aboard Fappiano to win the December 20, 1979 when cold weather had frozen the racetrack surface. However, in spite of the difficult racing conditions, Fappiano broke the Meadowlands track record for six furlongs with a time of 1:08 3/5.

The only filly to win the Morven Stakes was Clever Power in 1987. Ridden by future Hall of Fame inductee, Kent Desormeaux, she won easily by four lengths for owner Sondra Bender.

Records
Speed record:
 0:57 4/5 @ 5 furlongs on turf: Numbers Man (2001)
 1:08 3/5 @ 6 furlongs on dirt: Fappiano (1979)

Most wins by a jockey:
 2 - Angel Cordero Jr. (1979, 1982)
 2 - Shaun Bridgmohan (1998, 2000)

Most wins by a trainer:
 no trainer won this race more than once.

Most wins by an owner:
 2 - Sondra D. Bender  (1987, 1992)

Winners

References

Discontinued horse races
Flat horse races for two-year-olds
Previously graded stakes races in the United States
Horse races in New Jersey
Sports in New Jersey
Recurring sporting events established in 1978
Recurring sporting events disestablished in 2001
Meadowlands Racetrack
1978 establishments in New Jersey
2001 disestablishments in New Jersey